Liu Yu-Hsin (born 3 March 1993) is a Taiwanese table tennis player. Her highest career ITTF ranking was 102.

References

1993 births
Living people
Taiwanese female table tennis players
21st-century Taiwanese women